"Tattoo" is a song written by Siouxsie and the Banshees that was first released as the B-side of the "Dear Prudence" single in 1983. It was included on two compilations: 2004's Downside Up and 2015's Spellbound : The Collection. 

"Tattoo" was composed and performed as a three-piece by singer Siouxsie Sioux, bassist Steven Severin and drummer Budgie.   
During this era, the band experimented other ways of recording and orchestration when they were in the studio to record extra-tracks for their singles. For "Tattoo", producer Mike Hedges made them use the mixing desk as an instrument. With his assistance, they recorded a track with whispered voices, droning basslines and slow drum beats. The result was spooky and atmospheric.  
 
"Tattoo" is considered to be a proto trip hop track which helped Tricky when he shaped his style. This film noir track is often cited as inspirational in the development of the trip hop genre. "Tattoo" was covered by Tricky in 1996 as the opening number of his second album, Nearly God. It was also covered by Jay Jay Johanson in 2022.

NME retrospectively reviewed it as "spellbinding" in 2009 while praising the four-cd box set Downside Up.

References

1983 songs
Siouxsie and the Banshees songs
Songs written by Siouxsie Sioux
Songs written by Budgie (musician)
Songs written by Steven Severin